Eeswar is a 2002 Indian Telugu-language action drama film directed by Jayanth C. Paranjee, starring Prabhas and Sridevi Vijaykumar.  Siva Krishna and Revathi played supporting roles. It marked the debut of Prabhas, nephew of popular Telugu actor Krishnam Raju. However, it didn't prove him well enough as a popular hero until the release of his blockbuster Varsham.  The film was later dubbed into Hindi as Humla: The War (2009) and into Bengali as Bhalobashar Jeet.

Plot
Eeswar (Prabhas) is a motherless child and brat living in Dhoolpet, a slum area in Old City. Eeswar's father (Siva Krishna) manufactures Gudumba (Arrack) with the help of neighborhood people. Eeswar falls in love at first sight when he sees a college-going beauty Indu (Sridevi Vijaykumar). In the meantime, Eeswar's father marries Sujatha (Revathi), who has been waiting for him for the past 20 years so that she can be a good mother to Eeswar. Eeswar hates his stepmother thinking that his father married her to enjoy worldly pleasures. Meanwhile, Indu's father turns out to be a local MLA (Kolla Ashok Kumar) who hates poor. The local MLA sends goons to finish Eeswar off. What follows next forms the second half of the film.

Cast

Prabhas as Eeswar
Sridevi Vijaykumar as Indu, Eeswar's love interest 
Dheeraj Krishna Nori as Desi Dheeraj
Revathi as Eeswar's stepmother
Ravikanth
Hanumanthu
N. Hari Krishna
Siva Krishna as Eeshwar's father
Kolla Ashok Kumar as Indu's father
Abhinaya Krishna as Eeswar's friend
Brahmanandam as Priest
Allari Subhashini
Pavala Syamala

Soundtrack

Music was composed by R. P. Patnaik. All songs were penned by Sirivennela Seetharama Sastry. Music was released by Aditya Music company.

Reception 
A critic from Idlebrain.com said that "Over all, it's an average flick and worth watching for all curious people to see how Prabhas fared". A critic from Sify opined that "On the whole Takkari Donga director Jayant C Paranji’s new film Eeswar is lacklustre".

References

External links
 

2000s Telugu-language films
2002 action drama films
2002 films
Indian action drama films
Films shot in Jammu and Kashmir
Films shot in Hyderabad, India
Films directed by Jayanth C. Paranjee